Vikings is a historical drama television series. Vikings is inspired by the sagas of Viking Ragnar Lothbrok, one of the best-known legendary Norse heroes and notorious as the scourge of England and France.

Total nominations and awards for the cast

ASC Awards
The American Society of Cinematographers presents the annual ASC Awards to recognize outstanding cinematography in film and television. Vikings has been nominated once.

Canadian Cinema Editors Awards
The Canadian Cinema Editors is a non-profit organization which promotes the art and science of picture editing in all media, they host annual awards honouring professional film editors. Vikings has been nominated once.

Canadian Screen Awards
The Canadian Screen Awards are given annually by the Academy of Canadian Cinema & Television recognizing excellence in Canadian film, English-language television, and digital media. Vikings has been nominated twenty two times, winning nine awards.

Critics Choice Television Awards
The Critics' Choice Television Awards are presented annually by Broadcast Television Journalists Association.  Vikings has been nominated once.

Directors Guild of Canada Awards
The Directors Guild of Canada hosts an annual awards ceremony recognizing achievement in directing, production design, picture and sound editing. Vikings has won five out of eleven nominations.

Emmy Awards
The Emmy Awards recognizes excellence in television production and is considered one of the top honors in the industry.  Vikings has received eight nominations.

Golden Maple Awards
The Golden Maple Awards are annual awards presented by the Academy of Canadians in Sports and Entertainment – Los Angeles to Canadian actors performing in television shows broadcast in the United States. Vikings has been nominated three times.

Golden Reel Awards
The Golden Reel Awards are given annually by the Motion Picture Sound Editors.  Vikings has been nominated three times.

IGN Awards
The IGN Awards are chosen annually by the IGN editors, honoring the best in film, television, games, comics and anime. Vikings has been nominated three times.

Irish Film and Television Awards
The Irish Film and Television Awards are presented annually by the Irish Film & Television Academy. Vikings has garnered twenty three nominations, resulting in eight awards.

Makeup Artist and Hair Stylist Guild Awards
The Make-Up Artists & Hair Stylists Guild is the official labor union for make-up artists and hair stylists in film, television, stage, commercials and digital media. The annual awards recognize artistic achievement from its members. Vikings has received four nominations.

OFTA Television Awards
The OFTA Television Awards are presented annually by the Online Film & Television Association.  Vikings has been nominated twice.

Satellite Awards
The Satellite Awards are annual awards given by the International Press Academy.

Saturn Awards
The Saturn Awards are awarded annually by the Academy of Science Fiction, Fantasy and Horror Films to honor science fiction, fantasy, and horror in film and television. Vikings has been nominated once.

VES Awards
Visual Effects Society honors achievement in visual effects in film, television, commercials, music videos and video games. Vikings has been nominated nine times, and won once.

Women's Image Network Awards
Women's Image Network Awards are annual awards presented to individuals who promote women and girls in the media. Vikings has been nominated five times, with director Helen Shaver winning two awards.

Young Artist Awards
The Young Artist Awards are awarded annually to young actors in film and television. Vikings has been nominated once.

References

Vikings